Puerto Rico Highway 10 (PR-10) is a major highway in Puerto Rico. The primary state road connects the city of Ponce in the south coast to Arecibo in the north; it is also the shortest route between the two cities.

Construction on the modern PR-10, a new  highway, began in 1974.  The highway is being built parallel to the old PR-10; that road is now signed PR-123. Most of the new PR-10 is now complete, with an approximately  stretch still remaining to be finished. In its current state it is a freeway only in the completed portions, which consists of over three-fourths of the highway.

In May 2010, Autoridad de Carreteras estimated the road would be completed in 2015, at a cost of $500 million. Upon completion, the highway is expected to become one of the two major roads on the island that cross the Cordillera Central mountain range. The first section of the road was inaugurated in the year 2000. After "more than 40 years" since the project was initiated, as of 22 January 2017,  remained to be completed.

Route description
PR-10 runs over the scenic mountains of the Cordillera Central, providing magnificent views of the surrounding mountain tops in the distance. "The road is of first class construction throughout, and presents a panorama of magnificent scenery, rivaling the views of any of the famed roads of Europe." Several sections of the new highway require the construction of bridges. The new road will reduce travel time.

Ponce to Adjuntas

PR-10 starts at PR-5506, near PR-1, at the entrance to Mercedita International Airport. For its first four miles it runs in a northwesterly fashion, just north of the city of Ponce, bypassing city traffic. The road crosses barrio Sabanetas, where it has an interchange with PR-52 which leads to Mayagüez and San Juan.  The road also crosses barrio Machuelo Abajo, where it has an interchange with PR-14 which leads to downtown Ponce and Coamo. The road then crosses barrio Machuelo Arriba, where it has an interchange with PR-505 which leads to downtown Ponce and barrio San Patricio. Further west the road then crosses barrio Portugués, where it has an interchange with PR-503 which leads south to downtown Ponce and north to barrio San Patricio and to barrio Consejo in southern Jayuya. In the same interchange area there is also access to PR-504 which leads to downtown Ponce and to the northern areas of barrio Portugués. The road then enters barrio Portugués Urbano where it meets with the northern terminus of PR-9 which leads to PR-2 in Ponce's barrio Canas.

At this point PR-10 turns sharply north and heads into the mountains of barrio Tibes. Halfway through Tibes it intersects PR-503. It runs shortly through barrio San Patricio before entering barrio Guaraguao. As it enters barrio Guaraguao, the  road intersects with PR-515 which leads to PR-123, the old road between Ponce and Arecibo. Continuing on its northerly course, PR-10 then enters the municipality of Adjuntas via Adjuntas' barrio Portugués, the barrio where Ponce's Río Portugués has its origin. As the road exits Adjuntas' barrio Portugués and enters barrio Saltillo, it intersects with Puerto Rico's Panoramic Route, PR-143, which leads to downtown Adjuntas and Barranquitas. As it continues north bypassing the town of Adjuntas, PR-10 intersects with PR-521 leading to downtown Adjuntas and to PR-143.  The road continues north but shortly thereafter it comes to an abrupt end as a freeway, and motorists must detour by exiting into the narrower PR-5516. After a negligible run south on PR-5516, a road signed PR-5518 is used to continue the detour into the old PR-10, now signed PR-123, and which will continue to head north as the temporary route back onto the new limited access PR-10.

Adjuntas to Utuado
PR-123/PR-10 is a curvy road that leads to Utuado, the next town before the new PR-10's terminus in Arecibo. At this point the road is traversing some of the tallest peaks of the Cordillera Central. The road presents views of the mountains nearby, but probably not as good as those that can be seen traveling the new PR-10, as trees alongside the new road have been removed to make for a shoulder and an additional clearing next to the shoulder, and thus removing foliage that blocks the view of the nearby scenery.

PR-10 continues north intersecting with PR-135 that leads west to Lake Guayo, located between Adjuntas and Lares. It continues north for approximately 15 miles before reaching the new PR-10 again just before reaching the town of Utuado.  In this stretch of the road, construction of the new PR-10 is visible, interchangeably to both the left and right sides of PR-123, as the new road carves its way through the mountains. Río Grande de Arecibo has its origin in this area and is visible mostly to the east of PR-123. In this stretch of the road, Puerto Rico Highway 123 intersects with PR-524, leading west to Jayuya. About one-half mile before entering the town of Utuado, PR-123 intersects with PR-603 which provides the access for motorists to re-enter the new PR-10 again. The new PR-10 bypasses downtown Utuado and heads towards Arecibo.

Utuado to Arecibo

PR-10 runs alongside Río Grande de Arecibo for several miles. The road intersects with PR-111 which leads west to the town of Lares, in the lower Central Karst Zone, and east to downtown Utuado and on to Caonillas Lake west of Utuado. The roads continues north and it intersect the old road to Arecibo, PR-123. Further north the road also intersects PR-621 which leads to PR-146 and Dos Bocas Lake, a major source of hydroelectricity. Traversing the Central Karst Zone, PR-10 follows a course parallel to Rio Grande de Arecibo. A connection road, PR-6626 provides access to PR-626, which leads to various rural Arecibo barrios. Continuing north, PR-10 exits the mountain area, reaching Puerto Rico's northern coastal valleys, and intersects again with PR-123, in the area of San Pedro. Shortly after this point, the road becomes a divide highway. Further north, the road intersects with PR-651 for access to Hatillo. Another intersection, PR-652, provides access to the communities in the southern edge of the city of Arecibo, and leads to the Arecibo Observatory. The road then has an interchange with PR-22, the main limited access highway on Puerto Rico's northern coast. A little over a mile later, PR-10 comes to an end as it intersects with PR-2.

History

First road

The history of PR-10 is closely linked to PR-123 (the old Ponce-to-Adjuntas Road) which predates it.

PR-123 dates to the late 19th century when it was built under the colonial government of Spain to connect the coffee-growing town of Adjuntas to the port city of Ponce as a farm-to-market road.

When the PR-10 road started construction in the mid-1970s, the then Ponce-Arecibo Road, which used to be signed PR-10, was resigned PR-123 and the new road was signed PR-10. Today, PR-10 signs refer to the new road, whereas PR-123 signs refer to the old road. The old road is roughly parallel to the new PR-10. The exception to this is in the area between the towns of Adjuntas and Utuado, where construction of PR-10 is not yet complete and traffic is detoured to use the PR-123. In that area PR-10 signs identify the old road.  Prior to 1974, the full length of the old road was, in fact, signed PR-10. This route signing can still be seen in some old street maps of the city of Ponce. PR-10 is an alternate route to PR-123.

Navigating the old Ponce-Arecibo road was very tedious as the road was engineered to run from mountainside to mountainside, following the contours of the mountains, and along the natural definitions of the course of rivers, to reach its destination. Driving was rather hazardous, especially for trucks.

New road

One of the reasons to build a new road was the expected use by large trucks which the old road could not accommodate. Also, as traffic on the old road increased in the 1950s and 1960s, that road started to show its limits. To ameliorate the situation, in 1974 the Puerto Rico Department of Transportation and Public Works started planning for the construction this road to connect the cities of Ponce and Arecibo. While one of the main reasons to build the new PR-10 was to facilitate the movement of trucks in the mineral exploitation of the area, such exploitation met with considerable opposition from environmental advocates and today the road is being built to promote other types of socio-economic developments, such as those associated with the Port of the Americas.

PR-10 was inaugurated in the year 2000.

Cost
The new Puerto Rico Highway 10 is being built in three segments and, as of November 2010, only the middle segment remained to be built.  The first segment, the road from Utuado to Arecibo was built at a cost of $120 million; the second segment, the road from Ponce to Adjuntas, was built at a cost of $80 million.

The remaining segment, from Adjuntas to Utuado, is partly complete.  Due to the complexities of road-building in the remaining segment, this last segment is being built in nine phases.  The first phase, consisting of 1.24 km of roadway, was completed at a cost of $7.9 million and opened to the public on 21 August 2009. Phases 2 and 3 were already also under construction at the time that the beginning of phase 4 was announced on 25 August 2010. Phase 4 will cost of $8.7 million. At that juncture, phase 5 was being readied for bidding. The last four phases were under engineering design in August 2010. The total cost of these last five phases (phases 5 through 9) is projected to be $179 million.  During a 2013 presentation by the Puerto Rico DTOP, the last three Utuado-to-Adjuntas phases that were at that point in the design phase ("etapa de diseño"), and known as phases II, III, and IV (synonymous with former phases 7, 8, and 9), would cost $31.8M, $31.3M, and 34.5M, respectively, to build for a total cost-to-build of $97.6 million.

Travel time
The new road runs mostly parallel to PR-123, and for the area that is still under construction, motorists must use a stretch of PR-123 before reaching PR-10 again. The incomplete stretch will link Adjuntas to the mountain town of Utuado.  It takes about half hour travel on PR-123 to reach the new PR-10 road, and about one hour and 20 minutes to travel the full length of the road from Ponce to Arecibo. Before the building of the new PR-10 highway, just the stretch from Utuado to Arecibo used to take one hour to travel; it now takes 15 minutes.

Possible addition of metal nets
On 8 November 2010, large rocks fell on a section of the new PR-10 in barrio Tibes leading to a 24-hour closure of the highway. It was the second time that heavy rains had caused rocks to fall onto the highway in a period of a few months. Meanwhile, northbound traffic was detoured to PR-515 and southbound traffic was detoured to PR-123, the old PR10-signed road.  As a result, the Puerto Rico DTOP is assessing whether the area would be a candidate for the installation of metal nets that would minimize the possibility of further erosion.

Environmental concerns

The building of the new PR-10 was an issue of contention based on environmental reasons related to the effect on the virgin Cordillera Central. When a group of American corporations attempted to lease land from the Government of Puerto Rico to exploit nickel, copper and cobalt mines, a grassroots effort by Puerto Rican townspeople had the government turn away from the idea. The plan had its roots in a so-called Plan 2020, the result of a study by a group of U.S. consultants eyeing economic regeneration for Puerto Rico at the expense of the environment.

The frequent rain and high humidity as well as the mountainous terrain of the area traversed by PR-10 make for a road building challenge for road engineers who have come to the use of recycled ground vehicular rubber tires as an innovative solution. The government calls PR-10 "Puerto Rico's first green road" for its use of recycled car tires to build the surface of the road.

Fate of the old road
No plans have been disclosed to close the old PR-123 after the new PR-10 construction project is complete, and PR-123 will likely serve mostly as a local route. Today, the old highway is signed as PR-123 in those stretches of the road where the newer PR-10 parallels it. As new stretches of the PR-10 road are completed and opened to traffic, the corresponding stretch of the old PR-10 road is being signed PR-123.

Future
The new highway was anticipated to be completed by 2015 at a cost of $500 million, however remains incomplete at the present moment.  When the new PR-10 highway is completed, travel time between Ponce and Arecibo will be significantly reduced. The new PR-10 provides a second safe route to cross the island from north to south, in addition to PR-52. Except for a  stretch of road between km 13.45 and km 15.10, where the road is only two lanes wide, the road is either a three- or four-lane highway. The road is listed as part of the National Highway System.

Major intersections

See also

 List of highways in Ponce, Puerto Rico
 List of highways numbered 10
 Anillo de Circunvalación de Ponce

References

Further reading

External links

 PR-10 as it crosses Barrio Pellejas, in the municipality of Adjuntas
 A three-lane section of PR-10 in the municipality of Adjuntas
 PR-10 changing from a 2 to a 3-land road in barrio Tibes in the municipality of Ponce

010